Oscar Clark Hathaway (March 1, 1833November 1, 1909) was an American miner, ore merchant, and Republican politician.  He served four years in the Wisconsin State Senate, representing Grant County.

Biography
Hathaway was born on March 1, 1833, in Swanton (town), Vermont. He moved to Wisconsin in 1853, and engaged in iron manufacturing in Mayville, Wisconsin, and lead mining in Beetown, Wisconsin.

He died in Exeter, California, on November 1, 1909.  He was buried at Home of Peace Cemetery in Porterville, California.

Political career
A Republican, Hathaway was Chairman of the Town Board of Beetown in 1872 and 1873.  He represented the 16th District in the State Senate during the 1876, 1877, 1878, and 1879 sessions.

References

External links

People from Swanton (town), Vermont
People from Mayville, Wisconsin
People from Beetown, Wisconsin
Republican Party Wisconsin state senators
1833 births
1909 deaths
Burials in California
19th-century American politicians